Byblos script may refer to:

 Byblos syllabary (c. 1700 BC)
 Phoenician script (c. 1200 BC)